Thomas Ward Veazey (January 31, 1774July 1, 1842) was a Maryland politician that served in a variety of roles. The zenith of his career was being the 24th Governor of the state from 1836 to 1839, when he was selected to serve three consecutive one-year terms by the Maryland General Assembly. Veazey was the last Maryland governor to be elected in this fashion and also the last Whig Party member to serve as Maryland governor.

Biography
Thomas Ward Veazey was born at "Cherry Grove," in Cecil County, on January 31, 1774.  He was the son of Edward Veazey and Elizabeth DeCausey.  His father was a Cecil County planter, who served as High Sheriff of Cecil County from 1751 to 1753  His mother and father died when Thomas was young, so the governor was orphaned at an early age.  He was married three times, and had a large family. He married his first wife, Sarah Worrell, of Kent County, Maryland, in 1794.  She died the following year, leaving a daughter. He then married his first cousin Mary Veazey. She died in 1810, leaving a family of five children. On September 24, 1812, Veazey married Mary Wallace of Elkton, by whom he was the father of five additional children.

He graduated from Washington College in 1795, then returned home to become a planter. He was a presidential elector for James Madison in 1808 and again in 1812. He began his career in the Maryland House of Delegates, serving from 1811 to 1812. During the War of 1812, he was in command of the forces which defended Fredericktown in Cecil County. He later served as Lieutenant-Colonel of the Forty-Ninth Maryland Regiment. He returned to his farm after the war, where he remained until 1833, when he was chosen as a member of the Governor's Council.

In 1835, the Whigs in the Legislature nominated Veazey as their candidate for governor to succeed James Thomas. He received 52 out of the 76 ballots cast and was sworn into office on January 14, 1836. The first impression made by the Veazey administration was favorable.  His administration authorized $8 million to begin projects such as the Chesapeake and Ohio Canal as well as the Baltimore and Ohio Railroad. The money appropriated was not in the Treasury, paving the way for the reckless irresponsibility which nearly bankrupted the State.

In 1836, the Reform Convention met in Baltimore and demanded the direct election of the Governor and the Senate, the elimination of the Governor's Council and the reapportionment of the House of Delegates. This act set the stage for the constitutional crisis of 1837, which his administration successfully resolved.  He was re-elected on January 2, 1837, receiving 70 of the 81 votes cast.  Governor Veazey was re-elected in 1838, and received 52 of the 81 votes. The gubernatorial election in 1838 marked the last time the General Assembly was to elect a governor. After 1838, the Governor would now be chosen directly by the people. The State Senate was also reorganized by awarding one Senator to each county and one to Baltimore City. The people would choose them directly while both the old Senatorial Electoral College and the Governor's Council were abolished in accordance with his recommendations.

The governor vehemently and firmly believed in slavery, advocated for a general system of education throughout the State, and expressed a great deal of interest and concern over the matter of internal improvements. When his term ended in January 1839, when he was succeeded by William Grason.

During his term as governor, Veazey became embroiled in a dispute with the State of Pennsylvania over the freedom of Margaret Morgan and her free born children who were kidnapped by slave kidnappers Edward Prigg and 3 other men. These men believed Margaret Morgan was the property of the late John Ashmore of Hartford County, Maryland. Governor Veazey had to negotiate with the Governor of Pennsylvania Joseph Ritner regarding the extradition of these slave catchers back to York County Pennsylvania.  Veazey had to obey the law so he extradited the 4 slave catchers back to York, Pa. Edward Prigg and the 3 others stood trial for kidnapping Margaret Morgan and her children.  They were tried and convicted by a jury in Pennsylvania.  This state conviction was overturned by the United States Supreme Court in Prigg vs. Pennsylvania in 1842. This overturning led to all of the state laws which protected African Americans in the Northern states from kidnappings by slave catchers in enslavement to be ruled unconstitutional. 
He then retired to his Cecil County plantation, where he died on July 1, 1842.  He was buried in the family cemetery at "Cherry Grove."

Legacy
His home, Greenfields, was listed on the National Register of Historic Places in 1972.

References

Governors of Maryland
Members of the Maryland House of Delegates
1774 births
1842 deaths
Washington College alumni
Maryland Whigs
Whig Party state governors of the United States
19th-century American politicians
People from Cecil County, Maryland